Razi Muhammed born  May 21, 1969 is an Indian film maker based in Kerala, India. Razi Muhammed did his BFA in Applied Arts at College of Fine Arts Trivandrum  and his MFA in Illustration and Photography at Maharaja Sayajirao University of Baroda. Then joined in Film and Television Institute of India and got his Diploma in Cinema with specialisation in Scenic Design in first class with first rank.

Four of his diploma films as art director (Athmiyam, Repentance, Moment of 10 years, Fire) were selected for the Indian Panorama Directorate of Film Festivals and achieved national and international awards. He has worked as illustrator for magazines, as graphic designer, as stage designer for theatre productions, large scale stage shows and other events in India and abroad, and as art director for feature films, short films, television shows, documentaries and music videos.

Directed  Velutha Rathrikal (White Nights), is an independent cinematic adaptation of the eponymous novel by Fyodor Dostoyevsky. The film won the Kerala State Film Awards for Best adapted script 2015. The film Cinematography done by Shehnad Jalal.

Directed 100 minutes docu fiction film ‘The Third Eye of Resistance’, a journey through the life of  activist film maker C. Saratchandran who travelled constantly with the camera and cinemas. The film won the Cinema of Resistance Award in Signs Film Festival 2013

Directed ‘Paradise Unexplored’ a travelogue film, a trip of 40 members group including adults and children to the north east states.

Razi Muhammed done art direction & Visual effects for  feature films in Malayalam and Hindi  
Uthaman (2001 film), Pakalpuram, Uthara, Seetha Kalyanam (2009 film), Freekick, Chal Chala Chal, Up & down his some films in this category.

Stage design for Badal Sarkar’s ‘Hattamala Naadinappuram’  staged at FTII, Pune, Video design for ‘Sagara Kanyaka’ produced by Abhinaya directed by Jyothish and ‘Bali’ produced by Natyasastra directed by Narippatta Raju.

References

1969 births
Living people
Film directors from Thiruvananthapuram
20th-century Indian film directors
Film and Television Institute of India alumni